Sandland is an international sand art festival held annually in Antalya, southern Turkey. It was established in 2006.

Each year, a different theme is chosen for the sculptures. Visitors are allowed to watch during the creation of sand sculptures. More than ten sand sculptors from around eight to ten countries all over the world create sand sculptures in nearly three weeks. The sculptures are nade durable for a time period of twelve months. The sculptures are illuminated in the darknes so that access is allowed also in the night.

Admission tickets are at  30.00 (US$7.00) for adults and  15.00 (US$3.00) for children of age 3-12. Discounts are available for students and seniors. Visiting hours are 9:30 - 23:00 between 1 May and 31 October, and from 9:00 to 19:00 between 1 November and 30 April.

References

External links
Sand Painting Show

Festivals in Ankara
Art festivals in Turkey
2006 festivals in Turkey
Recurring events established in 2006
Sand art
Colossal statues in Turkey